The Wodrow Society, established in Edinburgh in 1841, was a society 'for the publication of the works of the fathers and early writers of the Reformed Church of Scotland'.

The society, established in May 1841, was named after Robert Wodrow, the historian of the Covenanters. It ceased to publish in 1851.

Publications
 James Melville, The Autobiography and Diary of Mr. James Melvill, Minister of Kilrenny, in Fife, and Professor of Theology in the University of St Andrews, with a Continuation of the Diary, edited by Robert Pitcairn, 1842
 John Row, The History of the Kirk of Scotland, from the year 1558 to August 1637: With a continuation to July 1639, 1842
 David Calderwood, The History of the Kirk of Scotland, 1842-49.
volume one
volume two
volume three
volume four
volume five
volume six
volume seven
volume eight
 David Laing, ed., The Miscellany of the Wodrow Society, containing tracts and original letters chiefly relating to the ecclesiastical affairs of Scotland during the sixteenth and seventeenth centuries, 1844
volume one
 Robert Rollock, Select Works of Robert Rollock, ed. William Maxwell Gunn, 1844
volume one
volume two
 William King Tweedie, ed., Select Biographies, 1845
volume one
volume two
 John Knox, History of the Reformation... within... Scotland, ed. David Laing, 2 vols., 1848
 William Row, The Life of Mr. Robert Blair, Minister of St. Andrews, containing his autobiography, from 1593-1636; with supplement of his life and continuation of the history of the times, to 1680, ed. Thomas M'Crie, 1848
 Charles Ferme, A logical analysis of the Epistle of Paul to the Romans, translated from the Latin by William Skae, ed. William Lindsay Alexander, 1850

References

Text publication societies
Book publishing companies of Scotland
Publishing companies established in 1841
Publishing companies disestablished in the 19th century
Companies disestablished in 1851
1841 establishments in Scotland